In Hawaiian mythology, Paliuli is the equivalent of the Garden of Eden, a legendary paradise and the home of Princess Laieikawai (Lā'i.e.-i-ka-wai). It was used for several place names, including a sugar mill owned by Henry Perrine Baldwin.

The Makawao Union Church was built on its foundation.

Literally pali uli means "green cliff" in the Hawaiian language.

In another legend, Kū and Hinawelalani had three children; Kahanaiakeakua, Paliuli and Keaomelemele. They were raised separately. Paliuli was raised by Waka in Paliuli, Puna, Hawaii island.

References

The Hawaiian Romance of Laieikawaie, Martha Beckwith, translator.  Columbia University, 1917.

Hawaiian mythology